was a  after Kanpō and before Kan'en. This period spanned the years from February 1744 through July 1748.

Change of era
 1744 : The new era of Enkyō (meaning "Becoming Prolonged") was created to mark the start of a new 60-year cycle of the Chinese zodiac. The previous era ended and a new one commenced in Kampō 4, on the

Events of Enkyō era
 1744 (Enkyō 1): A great comet was visible in the sky for many months; this comet is likely to have been what is today identified as C/1743 X1 (De Cheseaux)....Click link for online Harvard-Smithsonian/NASA Astrophysics Data System
 1745 (Enkyō 2): Tokugawa Ieshige became shōgun of the Edo bakufu.
 1745 (Enkyō 2): First establishment of a market fair in the capital was to be found at the temple of Hirano, in the Ōmi province.
 1746 (Enkyō 3, 2nd month): A great fire sweeps through Edo.

Notes

References
 Nussbaum, Louis Frédéric and Käthe Roth. (2005). Japan Encyclopedia. Cambridge: Harvard University Press. ; OCLC 48943301
 Titsingh, Isaac. (1834). Nihon Odai Ichiran; ou,  Annales des empereurs du Japon.  Paris: Royal Asiatic Society, Oriental Translation Fund of Great Britain and Ireland. OCLC 5850691.
 Zhuang, T. (1988). Acta Astronomica Sinica, v29:2.

External links 
 National Diet Library, "The Japanese Calendar" -- historical overview plus illustrative images from library's collection

Japanese eras
1740s in Japan